Conversations with Friends is an Irish television serial based on the 2017 novel of the same name by the Irish author Sally Rooney. Developed by Element Pictures for BBC Three and Hulu in association with RTÉ, it is the second adaptation by this crew of a Rooney novel after Normal People in 2020. Conversations with Friends was first broadcast on 15 May 2022.
The series received generally favourable reviews with praise for the performance of lead cast and aesthetics.

Cast

Main
 Alison Oliver as Frances Flynn
 Sasha Lane as Bobbi Connolly
 Joe Alwyn as Nick Conway
 Jemima Kirke as Melissa Baines

Supporting
 Alex Murphy as Philip, Frances and Bobbi's friend
 Caoimhe Coburn Gray as Aideen, Frances and Bobbi's friend
 Justine Mitchell as Paula Flynn, Frances' mother
 Tommy Tiernan as Dennis Flynn, Frances' alcoholic father
 Kerry Fox as Valerie Taylor-Gates, Melissa's agent
 Tadhg Murphy as Derek, a long time friend of Nick and Melissa
 Sallay Garnett as Evelyn, Melissa and Nick's friend
 Emmanuel Okoye as Andrew, Aideen's boyfriend

Episodes

Production

Development
In February 2020, it was announced that Conversations with Friends would be made into a 12-episode miniseries, and that most of the creative team behind the adaptation of Rooney's second novel, Normal People, including Element Pictures, director Lenny Abrahamson, and co-writer Alice Birch, would be returning for this adaptation. Mark O'Halloran, Meadhbh McHugh, and Susan Soon He Stanton were added as writers, and Leanne Welham was added as a director.

Casting
The cast was announced in February 2021, with Joe Alwyn, Jemima Kirke, Sasha Lane, and Alison Oliver as the book's main quartet.

Filming
Principal photography began in April 2021, in Northern Ireland. Locations include Northern Ireland, Ireland, and Hvar, Croatia. Cast and crew were on set in Bray, County Wicklow that July.

Release
The series premiered/released on 15 May 2022, on  BBC Three and Hulu. It premiered on RTÉ One on Wednesday May 18 with a feature-length episode. Endeavor Content will distribute the series internationally.

Reception
On review aggregator website Rotten Tomatoes, the limited series holds a 60% approval rating based on 58 critic reviews, with an average rating of 6.7/10. The website's critics consensus reads, "'While the characters are unevenly compelling and the overlong plotting makes these Conversations often go in circles, this adaptation retains some of the observant wisdom that made Sally Rooney's novel shine." On Metacritic, the series has a score of 65 out of 100, based on 28 critics, indicating "generally favorable reviews".

References

External links
 

2022 British television series debuts
2022 British television series endings
2020s British LGBT-related drama television series
2020s British television miniseries
BBC television dramas
Bisexuality-related television series
Hulu original programming
Television shows based on Irish novels
Television shows filmed in Northern Ireland
Television shows filmed in the Republic of Ireland